Nadia Petrova was the defending champion, but she retired, due to a viral illness, in the quarterfinals against Melinda Czink.

Czink went on to win her maiden WTA singles title, defeating Lucie Šafářová 4–6, 6–3, 7–5 in the final.

Seeds

Draw

Finals

Top half

Bottom half

References
Main Draw
Qualifying Draw

Challenge Bell
Tournoi de Québec
Can